The Kulturpreis der Hansestadt Rostock is a German cultural award endowed with 3,500 euros.

From 1958 to 1995, up to five persons and associations were honoured annually, since 1996 it has been limited to one personality or association. Since 2003, the prize has been awarded every two years.

The prize is awarded to an individual or a body/association from the fields of culture, science, business and politics for an individual achievement or for a complete work, for cultural commitment and for achievements that significantly enrich the intellectual and cultural life of the Hanseatic city of Rostock. The cultural committee prepares a vote from the submitted proposals. The Lord Mayor decides on the awarding of the prize.

Prizes winners since 1989 
 1989: , sculptor; Werner Lindemann, Schriftsteller; Omar Saavedra Santis, author
 1990: , Member of the Citizens' Committee; Helmut Aude, Press Office Manager; Joachim Wiebering, Regional Superintendent, Moderator of the Round Table; Horst Vogt-Courvoisier, Provost, Moderator of the Round Table; Hans-Joachim Wagner, Church Music Director
 1991: , University organist. , scientific working place Mecklenburg dictionary
 1992: Detlef Hamer, journalist; Frank Schröder, historian (Rückgabe 2004).
 1993 Jugendzentrum M.A.U; ; Otto Brusch, cellist
 1994: , photographer Rudolf Eller, musicologist
 1995: , archivist; Manfred Schukowski for the care of the astronomical clock in the St. Mary's Church, Rostock
 1996: Arvid Schnauer, Pastor Ufergemeinde Groß Klein
 1997: Institut Français de Rostock
 1998: Norddeutsche Philharmonie Rostock on the occasion of its 100th anniversary.
 1999: Deutsch-Japanische Gesellschaft zu Rostock e.V..
 2000: Renate Oehme, former director of the conservatory
 2001: , historic preservationist
 2002: Urs Blaser of the MS Stubnitz e.V. for services to innovative cultural and youth work.
 2003: Annette Handke, director of the Literaturhauses Kuhtor
 2005: Shantychor "De Klaashahns" and the Filmverein "Ro-cine"
 2007: 
 2009: , Kantor at the St. Johannis and the Plattdeutsch-Verein Klönsnack-Rostocker 7 e.V.
 2011: media workshop at the institute for new media
 2013: Karl Scharnweber, church musician and composer.
 2015: Franziska Pfaff, director of the Welt-Musik-Schule "Carl Orff" of the Hansestadt Rostock e.V.
 2017: Jugendsinfonieorchester der Hansestadt Rostock.
 2019: Ulrich Ptak, curator of the Kunsthalle Rostock.

References 

Rostock
German awards
Awards established in 1989